Outwood is a settlement and was, from 1894 to 1933, a civil parish in the Bury Rural District in the administrative county of Lancashire, England.

History
Outwood was an area in the township of Pilkington in the ancient parish of Prestwich-cum-Oldham in the historic county of Lancashire. It was once called Outwood of Pilkington and is marked as Outwoods on the Yates Map of 1787 and on the later Greenwood and Hennet maps.

Under the Local Government Act 1894, Outwood was established as a civil parish and became part of the Bury Rural District in the administrative county of Lancashire, England. In 1933, Outwood civil parish was abolished and its former area was divided between Kearsley, Radcliffe and Whitefield urban districts.

References

External links
Boundary Map of Outwood CP

Populated places in Greater Manchester
Districts of England created by the Local Government Act 1894
Former civil parishes in Greater Manchester
Geography of the Metropolitan Borough of Bury